Zodarion germanicum is a spider species of the family Zodariidae. 

Like most Zodariidae, Z. germanicum is an ant-eating spider. It resembles ants structurally and behaviorally. Z. germanicum specifically mimics large dark ants, such as Formica cinerea, F. truncorum, and Camponotus ligniperda.

Zodarion germanicum is up to 5 mm in size. Adults occur in Germany from June to August. Unlike many other zodariid spiders, it is active during the day.

If the spider encounters an ant, it retreats and stalks its prey from behind. The bitten ant will continue its walk for about a minute before the poison immobilizes it. Only now the spider will approach its prey and carries it to its hideout.

Distribution
Zodarion germanicum occurs throughout Central Europe.

References

 Pekar, S. & Kral, J. (2002) Mimicry complex in two central European zodariid spiders (Araneae: Zodariidae): how Zodarion deceives ants. Biological Journal of the Linnean Society 75:517–532. Abstract

Sources
 Kosmos-Atlas Spinnentiere Europas (German)

germanicum
Spiders of Europe
Spiders described in 1837